Ian Harnarine is a Canadian film director and screenwriter. He is best known for his 2011 short film Doubles with Slight Pepper, which won the Genie Award for Best Live Action Short Drama at the 32nd Genie Awards in 2012.

Born and raised in Toronto to immigrant parents from Trinidad and Tobago, Harnarine studied physics and astronomy at York University and the University of Illinois before pursuing a film degree at New York University. While studying at NYU, he took classes under Spike Lee, who was credited as executive producer on Doubles with Slight Pepper. The film also won the award for Best Canadian Short Film at the 2011 Toronto International Film Festival.

Harnarine is currently working on a feature film version of Doubles with Slight Pepper for future release.

References

External links

Film directors from Toronto
Writers from Toronto
Canadian male screenwriters
Canadian people of Trinidad and Tobago descent
York University alumni
University of Illinois alumni
New York University alumni
Living people
Directors of Genie and Canadian Screen Award winners for Best Live Action Short Drama
Year of birth missing (living people)
21st-century Canadian screenwriters
21st-century Canadian male writers